Reece Brown may refer to:

 Reece Brown (footballer, born 1991), English footballer
 Reece Brown (footballer, born 1996), English footballer